The men's decathlon combined event at the 1972 Olympic Games took place on 7 & 8 September.  The favorite was Joachim Kirst, who had won the European Championship in 1969 and 1971.  The decathletes were unfortunate, as they had to re-open the Olympics, the morning after the postponement due to the tragic events of the Munich massacre.  As the events continued the favorite, Kirst, hit the third hurdle in the 110 metres and fell, dropping out of the race.

Results

100m

Long Jump

Shot put

High jump
All heights in metres.

400m

110m hurdles

Discus throw
All distance are in metres.

Pole vault

Javelin throw
All distance are in metres.

1500m

Final standings
Standings after Event 108 September 1972Legend:M = Mark, P = Points

Key:  WR = world record; p = pass; x = fault; o = cleared; NM = no mark; DNF = did not finish; DNS = did not start; DQ = disqualified; T = tied

References

External links
Official report

Men's decathlon
1972
Men's events at the 1972 Summer Olympics